Carabus planatus is a species of ground beetle from Carabinae family, that is endemic to Sicily.

References

Further reading
Biological cycle and morphological descriptions: 

planatus
Beetles described in 1843
Endemic fauna of Sicily
Beetles of Europe